Justice League Task Force refers to superheroes owned and published by DC Comics. It may also refer to:

Justice League Task Force (comics) - the name of a former DC Comics publication, as well as a superhero team.
Justice League Task Force (video game) - a video game developed by Blizzard Entertainment and published by Acclaim Entertainment.